Fuller Maitland Wilson (27 August 1825 – 4 September 1875) was a British Conservative Party politician.

Heath was elected MP for the Western Division of Suffolk at a by-election in 1875, but died under three months later.

During his life, Wilson was also a Justice of the Peace for Suffolk, Lieutenant-Colonel of West Suffolk Militia, and High Sheriff of Suffolk from 1873 to 1874.

Wilson married Agnes Caroline Kindersley, daughter of Richard Torin Kindersley, in 1852. One of their children was British soldier Henry Fuller Maitland Wilson.

He is buried in the graveyard of Saint George's Church, Stowlangtoft, Suffolk.

References

Conservative Party (UK) MPs for English constituencies
UK MPs 1874–1880
1825 births
1875 deaths
High Sheriffs of Suffolk
English cricketers
Suffolk cricketers
Marylebone Cricket Club cricketers